Bigger and Deffer (abbreviated as BAD on the album cover) is the second studio album by American rapper LL Cool J, released on May 29, 1987 by Def Jam Recordings and Columbia Records. It features the hit single “I’m Bad”, and the first commercially successful "rap ballad", "I Need Love". It also contains the track "Go Cut Creator Go", which paid homage to his DJ. Other tracks like “Kanday”, “The Do Wop”, “My Rhyme Ain’t Done”, “The Breakthrough”, and “The Bristol Hotel” were also popular with fans, and helped make the album a hip-hop classic. With over two million copies sold in the United States alone, it stands as one of LL Cool J's biggest career albums. Bigger And Deffer dominated the summer of 1987, spending 11 weeks at number one on the Billboard Top R&B/Hip-Hop Albums chart while also reaching number 3 on the Billboard 200 pop albums chart. 

In 1998, the album was selected as one of The Sources 100 Best Rap Albums. The cover photo was taken in front of Andrew Jackson High School in Queens (from which he dropped out), while standing on the hood of his Audi 5000, and the back cover was shot in his grandmother's basement (his residence at the time). Both images were shot by Glen E. Friedman.

Track listing
All tracks written and produced by LL Cool J and L.A. Posse, except where noted.

Personnel

Charts

Weekly charts

Singles

Certifications

References

1987 albums
LL Cool J albums
Def Jam Recordings albums
Albums recorded at Chung King Studios